Lawyer Viswanath is a 1978 Indian Telugu-language action film produced by Y. V. Rao and directed by S. D. Lal. The film stars N. T. Rama Rao and Jayasudha, with music composed by Satyam. It is a remake of the Hindi film Vishwanath (1978).

Plot 

Vishwanath is a middle-class public prosecutor with a penchant for justice and a soft corner for the common man that endears him to the masses. But then he commits the unpardonable sin of awarding life imprisonment to Prabhu – the son of industrialist G.N.K. – and his henchman Shakka on charges of rape and murder. Not many in the city know that G.N.K. is also an underworld don involved in all sorts of criminal activities. Fuming revenge, and using every trick of the trade, he gets him implicated in a bribery case, and condemned to short-term imprisonment. Once he is released and determined to seek revenge, by taking the law into his own hands, he lets loose a war against G.N.K. by systematically attacking his business interests, helped in the process by Kacheri Kondaiah.

Cast 

N. T. Rama Rao as Lawyer Viswanath
Jayasudha as Geeta
Satyanarayana as Kacheri Kondaiah
Prabhakar Reddy G.N.K
Allu Ramalingaiah as Pakshiraju Seetaramaiah / Pakshi
Kanta Rao as Kamalakar
Dhulipala as Judge
Rajanala as Lawyer D. P. Rao
Mukkamala as Raghavaiah
Ramana Murthy as Lawyer Varma
Ranganath as Bhaskar
Sarath Babu as Prabhu
Tyagaraju
Sri Lanka Manohar as Shakka
Sakshi Ranga Rao as Johny Jalaiah
Mada
K.V.Chalam as Varahala Shetty
Balakrishna as Kondaiah henchmen
Potti Prasad as Jail Warden
K. K. Sarma as Prisoner
Pandari Bai as Shanthamma
Kavitha as Gowri
Tiger Prabhakar as Soda Jaggu
Pushpa Kumari

Soundtrack 
Music composed by Satyam.

Reception 
Venkatrao of Andhra Patrika, in his review dated 23 November 1978, appreciated Rama Rao's performance and production values. He added that Lal's adaptation stands up to the original.

References

External links 
 

1970s Telugu-language films
1978 action films
1978 films
Films scored by Satyam (composer)
Indian action films
Indian films about revenge
Telugu remakes of Hindi films
Films directed by S. D. Lal